Mutton Bird Island is an irregularly shaped unpopulated island located close to the south-western coast of Tasmania, Australia. The Mutton Bird Island is part of the Southwest National Park and the Tasmanian Wilderness World Heritage Site.

Fauna
The island is part of the Port Davey Islands Important Bird Area, so identified by BirdLife International because of its importance for breeding seabirds. Recorded breeding seabird and wader species are the little penguin (3,000 pairs), short-tailed shearwater, (530,000 pairs), fairy prion (2,500 pairs), Pacific gull, silver gull and sooty oystercatcher.  Reptiles present are the metallic skink and Tasmanian tree skink.

See also

 List of islands of Tasmania

References

Islands of South West Tasmania